Miltzow is a railway station in the village of Miltzow and close to the town of Reinkenhagen, Mecklenburg-Vorpommern, Germany. The station lies of the Angermünde–Stralsund railway and the train services are operated by Deutsche Bahn and Ostdeutsche Eisenbahn.

Train services
The station is served by the following services:
Regional services   Stralsund - Greifswald - Pasewalk - Angermünde - Berlin - Ludwigsfelde - Jüterbog - Falkenberg - Elsterwerda
Regional services  (Rostock -) Stralsund - Greifswald - Züssow

References

External links
Deutsche Bahn website

Railway stations in Mecklenburg-Western Pomerania
Railway stations in Germany opened in 1863